Advanced Placement (AP) Biology (also known as AP Bio) is an Advanced Placement biology course and exam offered by the College Board in the United States. For the 2012–2013 school year, the College Board unveiled a new curriculum with a greater focus on "scientific practices".

This course is designed for students who wish to pursue an interest in the life sciences. The College Board recommends successful completion of high school biology and high school chemistry before commencing AP Biology, although the actual prerequisites vary from school to school and from state to state.

Topic outline
Topics covered by this course include:
Biochemistry
Botany
Cell biology
Developmental biology
Ecology
Evolution
Genetics
Microbiology
Molecular biology
Population biology
Zoology

In addition to the standard biology topics above, students are required to be familiar with a set of 12 specific biology labs, as well as general lab procedure.

Exam
Students are allowed to use a four-function, scientific, or graphing calculator.

Score distribution

Commonly used textbooks
Biology, AP Edition by Sylvia Mader (2012, hardcover )
Life: The Science of Biology (Sadava, Heller, Orians, Purves, and Hillis)
Campbell Biology AP Ninth Edition (Reece, Urry, Cain, Wasserman, Minorsky, and Andrew Jackson )

See also
Glossary of biology
A.P Bio (TV Show)

References

External links
 AP Biology at CollegeBoard.com
 AP Biology Teacher Community at CollegeBoard.org

Advanced Placement
Biology education
Standardized tests

zh:大学先修课程#科目